A military tunic is a type of medium length coat or jacket, the lower hem of which reaches down to the thighs all the way round. It is named after the tunic, a garment of similar length worn in Ancient Rome.

Development
In the second half of the seventeenth and into the eighteenth century, European soldiers wore a coat of a similar style to the civilian justacorps, which had wide skirts and was decorated with lace at the front and had broad cuffs. As the eighteenth century progressed, coats became tighter and broad lapels to expose the facing colour were introduced, initially in the Prussian Army. The skirts of the coat were turned back to form tails; this was initially a mark of the dragoon cavalry, but was soon adopted by the infantry too. By the start of the nineteenth century, this had evolved into a jacket that was cut to waist level at the front and had a short tail behind; in the British Army, this was called a "coatee". A coat with a skirt that reached down to thigh length had been introduced into both the Russian and Prussian armies at the end of the Napoleonic Wars, but was not widely adopted. However, by the end of the 1830s, there was a feeling that uniforms didn't offer soldiers sufficient protection from the elements or freedom of movement. While Russia experimented again with the tunic, Prussia adopted them for their whole army in 1842.

Adoption
France followed Prussia's lead, introducing a tunic for their line infantry in 1845. In 1851, the US Army introduced a long type of tunic which they called a "frock coat". The British eventually followed suit in 1855, their initial French-style double breasted tunic being replaced by a single breasted version in the following year. The tunic became almost universal military wear; at the start of the twentieth century, when the need for some kind of concealment became apparent, armies changed to drab coloured uniforms, the British and Americans in 1902, the Germans in 1910. In the British Army, the tunic continued as a field uniform until the introduction of British Battledress in 1938; the tunic continues to be worn for formal and ceremonial occasions.

Non-military use
The military tunic was quickly adopted by civilian organisations that needed a smart and practical uniform. It was introduced into the Royal Mail in 1868, and by the Metropolitan Police in 1864, replacing a tail-coat.

Gallery

See also 
Adjustierung
Waffenrock

References

Coats (clothing)
Jackets
Military uniforms
History of clothing (Western fashion)
History of fashion